Line to Tomorrow is a collection of science fiction and fantasy stories by American  writers Henry Kuttner and C. L. Moore, published by Bantam Books in 1954. The book carried the byline of their joint pseudonym Lewis Padgett; the title is sometimes reported as Line to Tomorrow and Other Stories of Fantasy and Science Fiction. Two of the stories were originally published under Kuttner's byline, but all are now generally considered joint efforts.

Reception
Anthony Boucher described the collection as "consistently top-grade Padgett," praising its "superlative combination of literary quality, narrative drive, and detailed scientific or fantastic thinking."

References

1954 short story collections
Science fiction short story collections
Fantasy short story collections